The Bundang-Suseo Urban Expressway (Korean: 분당수서도시고속도로; Bundang Suseo Dosi Gosok Doro), is an urban expressway in South Korea, connecting Bundang-gu to Sujeong-gu in Seongnam, Gyeonggi Province.

Main stopovers
 Gyeonggi Province
 Seongnam (Bundang-gu - Jungwon-gu - Sujeong-gu)

Composition
 Notes
 IC :  Interchange
 IS :  Intersection
 (■): Motorway section

See also 
 Roads and expressways in South Korea
 Transportation in South Korea

References

External links 
 MOLIT South Korean Government Transport Department

Gyeonggi Province
Roads in Gyeonggi